Voltziales is an extinct order of conifers. The group contains the ancestral lineages from which all modern conifer groups emerged. The earliest Voltzialean conifers appear in the Late Carboniferous (Pennsylvanian). Modern conifer lineages emerged from voltzialean ancestors from the Late Permian to Jurassic. Voltzialean conifers outside modern groups such as Krassilovia/Podozamites survived into the Cretaceous, before becoming extinct. One of the earliest and most primitive genera is Walchia, known originally for its leaf form genus, and primitive members of the order are commonly called "Walchian conifers".  The order consists of these families:
 Utrechtiaceae
 Thucydiaceae
 Voltziaceae
 Emporiaceae
 Majonicaceae
 Ullmanniaceae
 Bartheliaceae
 Ferugliocladaceae
 Buriadiaceae
Krassiloviaceae

The genus Voltzia was named in honour of the French geologist Philippe Louis Voltz.

References

External links
 Voltziales (palaeos.org) 
 

 
Prehistoric plant orders